Yun Suk-young  (Hangul: 윤석영; ; born 13 February 1990) is a South Korean footballer who plays as a left-back and is currently playing for Gangwon FC in K League 1.

Club career

Jeonnam Dragons
Yun made his debut for Jeonnam Dragons in 2009 and went on to make a total on 86 appearances for the side.

QPR
Yun signed for Queens Park Rangers on the 30 January 2013 for an undisclosed fee on a three and a half year deal.
Yun did not make a senior appearance for QPR in his first season with the club, in which they were relegated from the Premier League. However, he was included in the match day squad as a substitute for the first game of the 2013–14 Championship season before making his first league start of the campaign the next week in the away trip to Huddersfield Town, where he provided the assist for Junior Hoilett's equalising goal.

On 18 March 2014 in away game at Sheffield Wednesday, Yun come in as substitute for Junior Hoilett at half time to cover the left-back position after Richard Dunne had been sent off. QPR lost the game 3–0. In the following game, on 23 March he played full 90 minutes against Middlesbrough and was awarded the Man of the Match. QPR won the game 3–1. He scored his first QPR goal on the 3 May 2014 in a 3–2 win against Barnsley.

Doncaster Rovers (loan)
Yun signed a two-month loan deal with Doncaster Rovers on 25 October 2013.

Charlton Athletic (loan)
On 15 February 2016, Yun signed for Charlton Athletic on loan until the end of season.

Brøndby IF
Signed for Brøndby IF on free transfer on 12 September 2016 a contract for the remainder of the year. On 9 December 2016, Brøndby IF announced, that Yun would leave the club at the start of the new year.

Kashiwa Reysol
On 1 January 2017, he joined J.League side Kashiwa Reysol. Yun made 10 appearances during the 2017 J1 League season, as Kashiwa finished fourth, qualifying for the 2018 AFC Champions League play-off round. The following January, he extended his contract until 2020.

FC Seoul (loan)
On 29 June 2018, he joined K League 1 side FC Seoul on loan for the second half of the season.

Gangwon FC (loan) 
Yun joined Gangwon FC on loan for the 2019 K League 1 season on March 5, 2019.

Busan IPark (loan) 
Ahead of the 2020 K League 1 season, he joined Busan IPark on loan from Kashiwa Reysol. Yun missed most of the season due to injury, making six appearances in total, as Busan were relegated to K League 2.

Gangwon FC 
On 6 January 2021, Yun returned to Gangwon FC, this time on a permanent deal. He scored his first goal for the club in a 3-0 home victory over Daegu FC on 10 April 2021.

International career
Yun played at Under 17 and Under 20 before appearing for the South Korea senior team on 16 October 2009 against Iran in a World Cup qualifier.

He also appeared in the 2012 Summer Olympics at Under 23 level, winning a bronze medal.

In the 2014 FIFA World Cup, Yun appeared in all three of South Korea's games during the group stage. The team finished last in their group with one point.

Club career statistics

Club
 

1Includes EFL Championship play-offs and AFC Champions League and K League Promotion-Relegation Playoffs.

References

External links

 Yun Suk-young – National Team stats at KFA 

1990 births
Living people
People from Suwon
South Korean footballers
South Korean expatriate footballers
South Korea under-17 international footballers
South Korea under-20 international footballers
South Korea under-23 international footballers
South Korea international footballers
Association football midfielders
Jeonnam Dragons players
FC Seoul players
Queens Park Rangers F.C. players
Doncaster Rovers F.C. players
Charlton Athletic F.C. players
Gangwon FC players
K League 1 players
Kashiwa Reysol players
J1 League players
English Football League players
Premier League players
Footballers at the 2012 Summer Olympics
Olympic footballers of South Korea
Olympic medalists in football
Olympic bronze medalists for South Korea
South Korean expatriate sportspeople in the United Kingdom
South Korean expatriate sportspeople in England
Expatriate footballers in England
Medalists at the 2012 Summer Olympics
2014 FIFA World Cup players
Asian Games medalists in football
Footballers at the 2010 Asian Games
Asian Games bronze medalists for South Korea
Medalists at the 2010 Asian Games
Sportspeople from Gyeonggi Province